Nag or NAG may refer to:

Computers
 Nag, a multi user tasklist manager included in Horde (software)
 Numerical Algorithms Group, a software company
 NAG Numerical Library, numerical analysis software
 Numeric Annotation Glyphs, in computerized chess

Music
 "Nag", a song on Joan Jett's album I Love Rock 'n' Roll
 Stage name of Jan-Erik Romøren of Norwegian band Tsjuder

Organizations
 Neighbourhood action group, community volunteer groups in the United Kingdom
 Neue Automobil Gesellschaft, a defunct German automobile manufacturer
 Nordic Aviation Group, an Estonian airline company

People
Martin Nag, Norwegian writer

Places
 Nag, Iran, a village in Kerman Province
 Nag Hammadi, in Upper Egypt
 Nag River, in India
 Nag Tibba, a mountain in Uttarakhand, India

Religion
 Nag Dhunga, a sacred stone worshiped by the people of Nepal
 Nag Hammadi library, a collection of Gnostic texts discovered in Egypt in 1945
 Nag Hammadi Codex II, a collection of early Christian Gnostic texts
 Nag Hammadi Codex XIII, a collection of early Christian Gnostic texts
 Nag Panchami, Hindu snake worship
 Nag Shankar, a temple in the Sonitpur district, India

Other
 Nag, a cobra in Rudyard Kipling's Rikki-Tikki-Tavi
 Nāg, refers to the Indian cobra
 Nag (missile), a third generation "fire and forget" anti-tank missile
 Nag Champa, an Indian fragrance
 Nag Hammadi massacre, a massacre of Coptic Christians in Egypt in 2010
 Nag Nag Nag, a former nightclub in London
 Nag Nathaiya (festival), in Varanasi, India
 Nag Vidarbha Andolan Samiti, a separatist political organization in Maharashtra, India
 Dr. Babasaheb Ambedkar International Airport (IATA code), Nagpur, India
 N-Acetylglucosamine, a biological molecule

See also
 Naga (disambiguation)
 Nāga, a deity in the form of a serpent in Hinduism and Buddhism
 Ichchadhari Naags, shape-shifting Nāgas in Indian folklore
 Nago, a city at the Okinawa Island in Japan
 Nagu, a former municipality in Finland
 Nag's Head (disambiguation)
 Nagging